Colin Beecher (born 16 October 1970) is a former professional tennis player from Great Britain.

Biography
Beecher, a right-handed player from Croydon, competed on the professional circuit in the 1990s. He faced two of Britain's rising stars in qualifying at the 1992 Wimbledon Championships, beating Tim Henman in straight sets, before falling to Greg Rusedski, 10–12 in the deciding set (although Rusedski was still a Canadian at the time). He featured in the main draw for the only time at the 1996 Wimbledon Championships and reached the second round, with an opening round win over fellow wildcard Nick Gould. In the second round he was beaten by Italian Renzo Furlan. On the ATP Tour he appeared in the main draw of two tournaments, at Nottingham in 1995 and Bournemouth in 1996.

Now a tennis coach, Beecher previously worked for many years for the LTA and captained Great Britain in the 2006 Fed Cup. He was captain of the Great British side which made the Junior Davis Cup final in 2009 and served as a coach on the 2015 Davis Cup winning team. On an individual level he has been the personal coach of several players including Anne Keothavong and Kyle Edmund.

References

External links
 
 

1970 births
Living people
British male tennis players
British tennis coaches
People from Croydon
Tennis people from Greater London
English male tennis players